Carlsborg is an unincorporated community and census-designated place (CDP) in Clallam County, Washington, United States. The population was 995 at the 2010 census, up from 855 at the 2000 census.

History
Carlsborg was founded in 1915 by C.J. Erickson, and named after his hometown in Sweden.  Its sawmill discontinued operations in 1968.

Geography
Carlsborg is located in eastern Clallam County at  (48.084085, -123.170290). U.S. Route 101 passes through the southern part of the community, leading east  into Sequim and west  to Port Angeles, the county seat.

Climate
This region experiences warm (but not hot) and dry summers, with no average monthly temperatures above . According to the Köppen Climate Classification system, Carlsborg has a warm-summer Mediterranean climate, abbreviated "Csb" on climate maps.

Demographics
As of the census of 2000, there were 855 people, 427 households, and 263 families residing in the CDP. The population density was 883.8 people per square mile (340.3/km2). There were 461 housing units at an average density of 476.6/sq mi (183.5/km2). The racial makeup of the CDP was 94.74% White, 1.40% Native American, 0.82% Asian, 0.70% from other races, and 2.34% from two or more races. Hispanic or Latino of any race were 1.64% of the population.

There were 427 households, out of which 13.3% had children under the age of 18 living with them, 54.1% were married couples living together, 5.2% had a female householder with no husband present, and 38.4% were non-families. 34.7% of all households were made up of individuals, and 22.2% had someone living alone who was 65 years of age or older. The average household size was 2.00 and the average family size was 2.51.

In the CDP, the age distribution of the population shows 14.7% under the age of 18, 3.3% from 18 to 24, 13.5% from 25 to 44, 20.0% from 45 to 64, and 48.5% who were 65 years of age or older. The median age was 64 years. For every 100 females, there were 92.6 males. For every 100 females age 18 and over, there were 86.4 males.

The median income for a household in the CDP was $28,103, and the median income for a family was $36,736. Males had a median income of $25,455 versus $16,618 for females. The per capita income for the CDP was $17,350. About 3.6% of families and 7.5% of the population were below the poverty line, including 7.2% of those under age 18 and none of those age 65 or over.

They are known for having two gas stations at the only traffic light on Highway 101 between Port Angeles and Sequim.

References

Census-designated places in Clallam County, Washington
Census-designated places in Washington (state)